{{DISPLAYTITLE:C13H8O4}}
The molecular formula C13H8O4 (molar mass: 228.20 g/mol, exact mass: 228.0423 u) may refer to:

 Euxanthone, a naturally occurring xanthonoid
 Urolithin A, a metabolite compound